William James Remar (born December 31, 1953) is an American actor. He has played numerous roles over a 40 year career, most notably Ajax in The Warriors (1979), Albert Ganz in 48 Hrs. (1982), Dutch Schultz in The Cotton Club (1984), Jack Duff in Miracle on 34th Street (1994), Richard Wright in Sex and the City (2001–2004), and Harry Morgan, the father of the title character, in Dexter (2006–2013). Since 2009 he has done voice-over work in ads for Lexus luxury cars. Remar studied acting at the Neighborhood Playhouse School of the Theatre in New York City.

Remar's more recent roles include Frank Gordon in Gotham from 2016 to 2019, and from 2018 to 2021, Peter Gambi in Black Lightning.

Career

Films
Remar has spent the majority of his film career playing villains. He portrayed the violent gang member Ajax in the cult film The Warriors (1979), and the murdering sociopath Albert Ganz in the hit 48 Hrs. (1982). Both films were directed by Walter Hill. Remar also played real-life 1930s-era gangster Dutch Schultz in The Cotton Club (1984).

In contrast to these roles, Remar starred in the film Windwalker (1980) as the young Cheyenne Windwalker, for which he spoke his lines in the Cheyenne language. He also portrayed a gay man in the film Cruising (1980). That same year, Remar had a cameo in the Western The Long Riders (1980) in a bar fight scene with David Carradine.

He was the star of the film Quiet Cool (1986) and was cast as Corporal Hicks in the science-fiction/horror film Aliens (1986), but because of drug related issues he was fired and replaced by Michael Biehn shortly after filming began. At least one piece of footage featuring Remar made it into the final version of the film: when the Marines enter the processing station and the camera tilts down from the Alien nest, though Remar is not seen in close-up. He is also filmed from the back as the Marines first enter the compound on LV-426 and when "Hicks" approaches the cocooned woman, again filmed from the rear so the viewer is unable to tell it is Remar and not Michael Biehn.

He played Quill, one of the main villains in The Phantom (1996). He appeared in Mortal Kombat: Annihilation (1997), the sequel to the film Mortal Kombat (1995), taking over the role of Raiden from Christopher Lambert. He then followed this with a role in the direct-to-video science fiction film Robo Warriors (1996). Other films include Psycho (1998), in which he played the patrolman, Drugstore Cowboy (1989), Tales from the Darkside: The Movie (1990), Wedlock (1991), Boys on the Side (1995), The Quest (1996), Rites of Passage (1999), Hellraiser: Inferno (2000), 2 Fast 2 Furious (2003), Fear X (2003), Blade: Trinity (2004), The Girl Next Door (2004). He played a brief role as General Bratt in the prologue of Pineapple Express (2008). He also had a role in the horror film The Unborn (2009), alongside C.S. Lee, who portrays Vince Masuka in Dexter. He also played the father of Olivia Grey in Feed (2017).

Remar was featured in the film X-Men: First Class (2011) and voiced the Autobot Sideswipe in the film Transformers: Dark of the Moon (2011), replacing André Sogliuzzo. He was also cast in the heist film Setup (2011) and starred in the film Arena (2011).

Remar played two different, unrelated characters in Quentin Tarantino's film Django Unchained (2012): Ace Speck and Butch Pooch. He starred, alongside Emma Roberts, Lucy Boynton, and Lauren Holly, in the thriller film The Blackcoat's Daughter (2015).

Television
Remar's television appearances include the series Miami Vice, Hill Street Blues, Sex and the City (as the on-again, off-again boyfriend of Kim Cattrall's character), Tales from the Crypt, Jericho, Third Watch, Justice League Unlimited, and Battlestar Galactica. He also appeared as a possessed mental patient in The X-Files ninth-season episode "Dæmonicus". He starred as Tiny Bellows on the short-lived television series The Huntress (2000–2001). He appeared in the miniseries The Grid (2004) as Hudson "Hud", the love interest of Julianna Margulies's character. He had a recurring guest role in the 2006 television series Jericho on CBS. Remar guest-starred in the CBS crime drama Numbers, playing a weapons dealer who later turns good and helps the FBI.

From 2006 to 2013, Remar co-starred in Dexter on Showtime. He was nominated for a Saturn Award for Best Supporting Actor for his portrayal of Dexter Morgan's adoptive father, Harry Morgan.

In 2010, he played guest roles as Giuseppe Salvatore in The CW series The Vampire Diaries and as James Ermine, a general for Jericho, a black-ops military contractor, on FlashForward.

He also voiced Vilgax in the animated television series Ben 10: Alien Force and Ben 10: Ultimate Alien, replacing Steve Blum. He guest-starred in Private Practice in 2010, playing a physician named Gibby, who works with Doctors Without Borders. On July 23, 2017, Remar was cast as Peter Gambi on the superhero drama Black Lightning. The series would run for four seasons from January 2018 to May 2021, Remar's Gambi a series regular for its entirety. He would then be cast in a recurring role on The Rookie as Tom Bradford, Tim’s father.

Personal life
In 1984, he married Atsuko Remar. They have two children, Jason and Lisa.

Filmography

Film

Television

Video games

Awards and nominations

References

Sources

External links

 

20th-century American male actors
21st-century American male actors
1953 births
American male film actors
American male television actors
American male video game actors
American male voice actors
American people of English descent
American people of Jewish descent
American people of Russian-Jewish descent
Living people
Male actors from Boston
Male actors from Massachusetts
People from Boston